Harry Kalaba (born 12 June 1976 in Mansa District, Luapula Province) is a Zambian politician and the current president for the Citizens First Party. He had served as Minister of Foreign Affairs of Zambia from March 2014 to January 2018. He is a former member of Patriotic Front. He served as the Member of Parliament for Bahati from August 2011 to February 2019.

After leaving the Patriotic Front party in 2019, he was chosen to stand as the presidential candidate at the 2021 Zambian general election for the Democratic Party. In July 2022, he left the Democratic Party after several issues and in October 2022, he became the president of the Citizens First Party.

See also
List of foreign ministers in 2017

References

Living people
Patriotic Front (Zambia) politicians
Foreign Ministers of Zambia
1976 births
Environment ministers of Zambia